Blood Red Cherry is an album by Canadian singer-songwriter Jann Arden, released in 2000 (see 2000 in music).

Track listing
All songs written by Jann Arden and Russell Broom, except where noted

"Waiting in Canada" – 3:43
"Cherry Popsicle" – 3:37
"Sleepless" – 4:38
"Never Give Up on Me" – 4:06
"Mend" – 4:11
"I Only Wanted Sex" – 3:38
"Taste of This" – 4:39
"Into the Sun" – 4:17
"In Your Keeping" – 3:59
"Best Dress" – 2:39
"Another Human Being" – 5:40
"Sorry for Myself" – 3:56
"Janeen" – 3:41
"Piece of It All" (Broom) – 5:05

Personnel
Jann Arden – vocals, background vocals
Gregg Bissonette – cymbals, drums
Jennifer Condos – bass guitar
Allison Cornell – viola
Jim Cuddy – background vocals
Davey Faragher – bass
Mark Goldenberg – keyboards
Rami Jaffee – keyboards, Hammond organ
Mauricio-Fritz Lewak – percussion
Dillon O'Brian – background vocals
John Philip Shenale – keyboards

Production
Producer: Mark Goldenberg
Executive producer: Jann Arden
Assistant engineers: Ok Hee Kim, Ronnie Rivera
Drum Loop: Mark Goldenberg
Mixing: Ronnie Rivera
Mastering: Doug Saks
Drum loop: John Philip Shenale
Production coordination: Shari Sutcliffe
Contractor: Shari Sutcliffe
Design: Jeth Weinrich
Photography: Jeth Weinrich

Charts
Album – Billboard (North America)

Year-end charts

References

Jann Arden albums
2000 albums